Pfeiffer Vacuum Technology AG is a German manufacturer of vacuum pumps. It is headquartered in Aßlar in Germany with 70% of the total production catering to the export market.

In July 1996 the company was listed on the NYSE and in April 1998 on the TecDAX. Due to low trading volumes, it was de-listed from the NYSE in October 2007.

Since January 2011 Adixen Vacuum Products is part of Pfeiffer Vacuum GmbH.

Highlights 
Export Ratio:	approx. 70% (estimated),
Stock Exchange Listings:	Deutsche Börse, Prime Standard/TecDAX,
Accounting:	IFRS,
Capital Stock:	€25,261 thousand,
Cash and Cash Equivalents:	€108,293 thousand,
Equity Ratio: 59%,
Net Sales:	€519,509 thousand,
Operating Profit:	€61,777 thousand,

Shareholder Structure 
Estimated regional split of the Pfeiffer Vacuum Shareholder Structure:
40% in Europe, 30% in the USA, 25% in Germany (thereof about 5 pp are held by Management and private Investors), 5% in Asia.

References

External links
Homepage of Pfeiffer Vacuum GmbH
Share Price Pfeiffer Vacuum Technology AG on deutsche-boerse.com

Companies based in Hesse
Engineering companies of Germany
German brands
Pump manufacturers
Companies in the TecDAX